The 2018–19 season was Leeds United's ninth consecutive season in the Championship. Along with competing in the Championship, the club also participated in the FA Cup and EFL Cup.

The season covers the period from 1 July 2018 to 30 June 2019.

Review

Leeds' season started with an impressive win against relegated Stoke City at Elland Road, followed by a 4–1 win against Frank Lampard's Derby County at Pride Park, moving Leeds up to 3rd in the Championship table.

Leeds' first defeat of the season was against former manager Garry Monk's Birmingham City in mid September, but by the turn of the year the side were in pole position, despite a 4–2 defeat to Nottingham Forest at the City Ground on 1 January 2019.

Before a 2–0 victory over Derby County on 11 January 2019, manager Marcelo Bielsa admitted he had sent a spy to Derby's training ground, after reports emerged in the press that a man was spotted the previous day outside the training ground. Derby manager Frank Lampard was critical of Bielsa's method. On 12 January, Leeds United released a statement in response to the incident. Tottenham Hotspur Manager Mauricio Pochettino described the incident as 'not a big deal' and commonplace in Argentina.

On 15 January, the EFL announced they would be investigating the incident. With intense media scrutiny on what was coined 'Spygate' in the media, Bielsa announced a press briefing on 16 January 2019, where he gave a detailed analysis of his research on a PowerPoint presentation to the gathered media and journalists, detailing his meticulousness, thoroughness and preparation over his opponents, with some journalists in attendance describing it as a 'coaching masterclass' and 'genius'.

The 'Spygate' saga was resolved on 18 February, when Leeds were fined a sum of £200,000 by the EFL for breach of a portion of Rule 3.4 of EFL Regulations ("In all matters and transactions relating to The League each Club shall behave towards each other Club and The League with the utmost good faith."), with the EFL also announcing a new rule as a result, that teams could not watch opposition training up to 72 hours before a game. It was subsequently revealed, by Bielsa, that he paid the £200,000 fine in full himself.

Towards the end of January Leeds missed out on signing Daniel James with the deal being pulled on the final day, but did sign Kiko Casillas from Real Madrid.

The team's form dipped in January & February, whilst some pointed towards the implications of Spygate, Bielsa refused to make excuses outside of himself.

Damaging defeats in March to Sheffield Utd & Birmingham City had left the promotion race out of their hands, and would need Norwich City & Sheffield Utd to slip up in order for Leeds to be promoted automatically. Two wins against Preston and Sheffield Wednesday briefly raised hopes before losses to 10 man Wigan at home and an away loss to Brentford would mean the side enter the playoffs.

This rendered our last two games almost meaningless, however they didn't go by quietly. The visit of Aston Villa saw tempers flare during the second half. The officials waved away calls for a foul as Klich took the lead for the Whites.

As players & staff broke out into a fracas, Marcelo Bielsa ordered his players to stand aside & Aston Villa were able to equaliser through an unopposed goal. The Leeds manager and his side later won the 2019 FIFA Fair Play award for their sportsmanship in this action.

Leeds entered the playoffs and played Derby County over two legs. In the first leg at Pride Park, Kemar Roofe handed Leeds a lead in the tie before returning to Elland Road.

Stuart Dallas gave the side a 2-0 aggregate lead, before a mix up between Kiko Casillas & Liam Cooper just before half time allowed Jack Marriott to reduce the deficit and give Frank Lampard's Derby County hope.

Negativity crept in and the home side threw the second leg away, allowing Derby to win 3-4 on aggregate. Jack Marriott's late goal sending Frank Lampard's Derby County to the playoff final.

Transfers

Transfers in

Transfers out

Loans in

Loans out

Pre-season 
Leeds announced pre-season friendlies against Forest Green Rovers, York City, Southend United, Oxford United, Guiseley and Las Palmas.

Competitions

Championship

League table

Results summary

Results by matchday

Matches
On 21 June 2018, the Championship fixtures for the forthcoming season were announced.

Play-offs

FA Cup

The third round draw was made live on BBC by Ruud Gullit and Paul Ince from Stamford Bridge on 3 December 2018.

EFL Cup

On 15 June 2018, the draw for the first round was made in Vietnam. The second round draw was made from the Stadium of Light on 16 August.

Player statistics

Appearances and goals

|-
! colspan=14 style=background:#dcdcdc; text-align:center| Goalkeepers

|-
! colspan=14 style=background:#dcdcdc; text-align:center| Defenders

|-
! colspan=14 style=background:#dcdcdc; text-align:center| Midfielders

|-
! colspan=14 style=background:#dcdcdc; text-align:center| Forwards

|-
! colspan=14 style=background:#dcdcdc; text-align:center| Players transferred out during the season

|-

|-

|-
! colspan=14 style=background:#dcdcdc; text-align:center| Loaned players who returned to their parent club during the season

References

Leeds United
Leeds United F.C. seasons
Foot